Joseph Warton (April 1722 – 23 February 1800) was an English academic and literary critic.

He was born in Dunsfold, Surrey, England, but his family soon moved to Hampshire, where his father, the Reverend Thomas Warton, became vicar of Basingstoke.  There, a few years later, Joseph's sister Jane, also a writer, and his younger brother, the more famous Thomas Warton, were born.  Their father later became an Oxford professor.

Joseph was educated at Winchester College and at Oriel College, Oxford, and followed his father into the church, becoming curate of Winslade in 1748. In 1754, he was instituted as rector at The Church of All Saints, Tunworth. In his early days Joseph wrote poetry, of which the most notable piece is The Enthusiast (1744), an early precursor of Romanticism. In 1755, he returned to his old school to teach, and from 1766 to 1793 was its headmaster, presiding over a period of bad discipline and idleness, provoking three mutinies by the boys.  His career as a critic was always more illustrious, and he produced editions of classical poets such as Virgil as well as English poets including John Dryden.  Like his brother, he was a friend of Samuel Johnson, and formed part of the literary coterie centered on the publisher Robert Dodsley.

A monument to Joseph Warton by the neoclassical sculptor John Flaxman is in Winchester Cathedral.

Works
The Enthusiast, or The Lover of Nature (1744)
Odes on Various Subjects (1746)
Essay on the Genius and Writings of Pope (volume 1: 1756; volume 2: 1782)

References

Noyes, Russell (Ed.) (1956). English Romantic Poetry and Prose. New York: Oxford University Press.

External links 

 Joseph Warton at the Eighteenth-Century Poetry Archive (ECPA)
 
 
 
 
 

1722 births
1800 deaths
English literary critics
Schoolteachers from Surrey
People from the Borough of Waverley
People educated at Winchester College
Alumni of Oriel College, Oxford
Headmasters of Winchester College
18th-century English non-fiction writers
18th-century English male writers
18th-century English poets
English male poets
English male non-fiction writers
People from Winslade